Easthorpe is a small village and former civil parish, now in the parish of Copford, in the Colchester district, in the county of Essex in the East of England. Easthorpe is on an old Roman road. Nearby settlements include the large town of Colchester and the villages of Marks Tey, Copford and Copford Green. The main A12 road and Marks Tey railway station are nearby. In 1931 the parish had a population of 113. On 26 March 1949 the parish was abolished and merged with Copford, part also went to Marks Tey and Messing cum Inworth.

Notable buildings
 St Mary's Church
 Easthorpe Hall
 Well Cottage
 St Mary's Grange

Notable people
 Caroline Maria Applebee (c. 1785–1854), watercolour artist

References

External links
 British History
The Buildings of England - Essex - Nikolaus Pevsner 2nd edition 1965

Villages in Essex
Former civil parishes in Essex
Borough of Colchester